The Orahovica Monastery is a Serbian Orthodox monastery in the village of Duzluk of Orahovica, Croatia. It is mentioned in 1583 when it was a seat of the Požega metropolitanate and an important culturo-religious center, located in the then Virovitica County. It is thought to have been built before the end of the 15th century.

See also 
 List of Serb Orthodox monasteries
 Serbs of Croatia

References

Further reading

External links
Feast of the Transfiguration in Orahovica Monastery at Virovitica.net

Serbian Orthodox monasteries in Croatia
16th-century Serbian Orthodox church buildings
Patriarchate of Peć